Andrey Stoev (born 2 October 1986) is a Bulgarian football defender who last played for FC Gandzasar Kapan of the Armenian Premier League.

References

Living people
1986 births
Bulgarian footballers
Bulgarian expatriate footballers
PFC Pirin Blagoevgrad players
FC Bansko players
OFC Pirin Blagoevgrad players
OFC Sliven 2000 players
First Professional Football League (Bulgaria) players
Expatriate footballers in Armenia

Association football defenders
Sportspeople from Blagoevgrad